State Route 193 (SR 193) is a state highway in the U.S. state of California that runs through Placer and El Dorado counties. It begins as an east–west arterial road running from Lincoln to Newcastle, just west of Auburn. Then after concurrencies with Interstate 80 and State Route 49 through Auburn, SR 193 resumes heading eastward from Cool to Georgetown, then turning south to rejoin SR 49 just north of Placerville.

Route description
 

SR 193 begins at the eastern city limits of Lincoln. The route formerly began at a junction with what was then SR 65 (now Lincoln Boulevard) in Lincoln, and was known as McBean Park Drive (SR 65 has since relocated to a new bypass alignment). The portion of SR 193 within the city of Lincoln was relinquished to the city in February 2011. The city has since been annexing more territory to include increasing areas of residential development, and thus SR 193's western end has been adjusted accordingly.

After leaving the city of Lincoln, SR 193 becomes known as Lincoln Newcastle Highway and enters rural Placer County. A few miles later, SR 193 passes over the tunnel containing Taylor Road before heading east on Taylor Road to an interchange with I-80 in Newcastle.

SR 193 runs concurrently on I-80 eastbound into the city of Auburn, where it then leaves I-80 and runs concurrently with SR 49. These concurrencies are unsigned. SR 193 resumes as Georgetown Road, heading east from SR 49, the town of Cool, and the Auburn State Recreation Area. The highway passes through the towns of Fords Corner, Greenwood, and Georgetown before turning south and encountering the town of Kelsey after several miles. SR 193 terminates at the northern city limits of Placerville at its second junction with SR 49.

SR 193 is part of the California Freeway and Expressway System, but is not part of the National Highway System, a network of highways that are considered essential to the country's economy, defense, and mobility by the Federal Highway Administration.

Major intersections

See also

References

External links

California @ AARoads.com - State Route 193
Caltrans: Route 193 highway conditions
California Highways: SR 193

193
State Route 193
State Route 193
Placerville, California